Rashid Asanov (born 9 January 1970) is a former Russian football player.

References

1970 births
Living people
Russian footballers
FC Kuban Krasnodar players
Russian Premier League players

Association football midfielders